Lac d'Allos is an alpine lake at a height of 2,230 m. It is located in Parc National du Mercantour, departement Alpes-de-Haute-Provence the region Provence-Alpes-Côte d'Azur, France.

Description

Lac d'Allos is a lake in the Alpes-de-Haute-Provence and is dominated by Mont Pelat (3052 meters), it is the largest natural high altitude lake in Europe. It covers 60 hectares and has a depth of 50 m. In the twelfth century, it was called Levedone.

The lake is situated nearby the municipality of Allos.

Gallery

See also
 Col d'Allos
 List of lakes in France

External links
 Lac d'Allos on Google Maps (Satellite)
 Information
  Info site about the lake

Mercantour National Park
Allos